Igli Tare (born 25 July 1973) is an Albanian retired professional footballer who played as a forward. He is the sporting director at Serie A club Lazio.

Tare joined Partizani Tirana as a 9-year-old in 1982, and would later go on to make his debut as a 15-year-old in 1988 before leaving Albania in 1992 to emigrate to Germany. He played in the lower leagues of Germany for Südwest Ludwigshafen and VfR Mannheim before joining Bundesliga side Karlsruher SC in 1996, initially playing for their reserve side before making his Bundesliga debut in 1996. He then joined Fortuna Düsseldorf in the 2. Bundesliga, where he scored 24 league goals in 63 games in two seasons before returning to the Bundesliga with 1. FC Kaiserslautern in 1999, where he netted four league goals in 26 appearances in one year and a half at the club.

After falling out of favour at 1. FC Kaiserslautern he joined Serie A side Brescia in January 2001, where he helped the side finish in a respectable 8th place. He remained at Brescia for a further two seasons, and he scored a total of 15 league goals in 75 games before joining fellow Serie A side Bologna in 2003. He spent two years at the club and scored 11 league goals in 55 games, before joining Lazio in a surprise move in 2005 following Brescia's relegation to Serie B. He was primarily used as a backup player at Lazio and he only scored four goals in 54 league games before retiring as a player at the age of 34 in 2008.

Early life
Igli Tare studied at the Qemal Stafa High School, in Tirana, Albania.

Club career
Tare began his professional career in 1996 with Karlsruher SC in Germany where he remained until 1997 before moving to Fortuna Düsseldorf in the 2. Bundesliga.

In 1999, Tare moved to 1. FC Kaiserslautern, where he played for a season before being signed by veteran Italian manager Carlo Mazzone. For five seasons, Tare played with Mazzone's Brescia, where he was able to play alongside Roberto Baggio, before again transferring, this time to Bologna where he was reunited with Mazzone once again.

At Bologna, Tare was popular amongst the fans and scored an important goal in the relegation play-off against fierce rivals Parma, however Tare's goal was not enough and they lost the return leg at home, being relegated to Serie B.

Following Bologna's relegation, Tare was loaned out to capital club Lazio scoring just three goals in his first season. Following this loan period, Tare joined the club on a permanent basis.

Tare was not a regular starter under Delio Rossi, but was able to play and score vital goals when others were out with injuries. In late 2007 away to Palermo, Tare scored off a Lorenzo De Silvestri cross, ending a scoring drought which stretched back for almost two years. He backed this goal up with another vital goal in the Coppa Italia against Napoli, which proved to be the winner.

International career
Tare was capped 68 times by the Albania national team and scored ten goals. As one of the most experienced members of the side, Tare was long time captain of the national team.

Tare's most impressive performance for his national side came during his nation's match against Russia in the UEFA Euro 2004 qualifiers, when he helped Albania to a 3–1 victory, scoring his team's third goal.

In 2007, Tare's international career was effectively ended, after being dropped by manager Otto Barić.

Style of play
A tall, physical, and combative forward, Tare usually played as a centre-forward or as a striker, and was mainly known for his ability in the air, as well his work-rate, professionalism, solid technique, and capacity to link-up with teammates, despite not being a significantly elegant or prolific player.

Post-playing career
Tare's Lazio contract expired at the end of the 2007–08 season. He then accepted a non-playing role at Lazio, becoming the club's team manager. In April 2009 he completed a course in order to receive his qualification to be sporting director, which is his current role at Lazio.

Personal life
Igli Tare is a well known supporter of Albanian related issues. He was a supporter of the Albanian cause and the Kosovo Liberation Army during the Kosovo war. He helped the Albanian refugees who had been expelled during the Kosovo war with money and accommodation in Albania.

In the 2005–06 Serie A season in the game Inter against Lazio, there were numerous provocations between Igli Tare and Siniša Mihajlović. In the half-time break, Tare slapped Mihajlović with two fists. Tare said Mihajlović had provoked him the entire First Half and then he had responded accordingly. Igli Tare later told the Albanian media that he did not regret anything.

The rivalry between Tare and Mihajlović took another level in 2016. During 2015–16 Serie A season, Lazio's President Claudio Lotito wanted Mihajlović as a coach for Lazio. Lazio's president had been working for weeks to get Mihajlovic. There is a good friendship between Lotito and Mihajlović and his return to Formello has been on the agenda for years. However Tare refused to accept Siniša Mihajlović as the new coach for Lazio and at the end prevented the move.

His brother Auron Tare, is a famous Albanian journalist and his brother Agron Tare is director at the Port of Durrës.

His son Etienne (born 2003) followed on his footsteps, becoming a striker too and now being part of the Lazio Primavera (Under-19 team) squad.

Career statistics

Club

International

Scores and results list Albania's goal tally first, score column indicates score after each Tare goal.

Honours
Individual
Career Award: 2018

References

External links
Official Lazio profile

1973 births
Living people
Footballers from Vlorë
Albanian footballers
Association football forwards
Albania international footballers
Albania under-21 international footballers
FK Partizani Tirana players
VfR Mannheim players
Karlsruher SC II players
Karlsruher SC players
Fortuna Düsseldorf players
1. FC Kaiserslautern players
Brescia Calcio players
Bologna F.C. 1909 players
S.S. Lazio players
Kategoria Superiore players
Bundesliga players
2. Bundesliga players
Serie A players
Albanian expatriate footballers
Expatriate footballers in Germany
Albanian expatriate sportspeople in Germany
Expatriate footballers in Italy
Albanian expatriate sportspeople in Italy
Qemal Stafa High School alumni
Albanian nationalists